The Ontario University Athletics (OUA) came into being in 1997 with the merger of the Ontario Universities Athletics Association and the Ontario Women's Intercollegiate Athletics Association. This is similar to what would be called a college athletic conference in the United States.

Notable games
On February 11, 2000, the Ontario University Athletics women's ice hockey program saw its longest game take place. The University of Toronto's Rhonda Mitchell scored on a 35-foot slap shot. It was the 5:07 mark of the eighth period and the Varsity Blues defeated York University. Although the victory allowed the U of T to advance to the OUA gold medal game, it was the longest in the history of Canadian women's hockey. The game lasted over five hours and ten minutes. York's player of the game was goaltender Debra Ferguson, as she valiantly made 63 saves over 125 minutes.
On March 3, 2011, a postseason match between the Queen's Golden Gaels and the Guelph Gryphons became the longest collegiate hockey game, male or female, Canadian or American — on record. The match began on Wednesday and it only ended on Thursday. The duration of the match was 167 minutes and 14 seconds when Queen's forward Morgan McHaffie placed a rebound past Gryphons goalie Danielle Skoufranis.

Members

Conference arenas

Champions

Regular season champions

McCaw Cup championship games
March 7, 2015: Western def. Guelph 2-0
March 12, 2016: Guelph def. Western 5-1
March 11, 2017: Guelph def. Nipissing 6-1
March 10, 2018: Western def. Queen’s 3-0
March 9, 2019: Guelph def. Toronto 4-2
March 6, 2020: Toronto def. York 3-1

National championship teams

Regular season scoring champions
In progress

Awards and honors

All-star teams

First Team 1999-2000

Second Team 1999-2000

First Team 1998-99

Second Team 1998-99

First Team 1997-98

Second Team 1997-98

First Team 1996-97

Second Team 1996-97

First Team 1995-96

Second Team 1995-96

First Team 1994-95

Second Team 1994-95

First Team 1993-94

Second Team 1993-94

First Team 1992-93

Second Team 1992-93

First Team 1991-92

Second Team 1991-92

First Team 1990-91

Second Team 1990-91

First Team 1989-90

Second Team 1989-90

First Team 1983-84

First Team 1982-83

First Team 1981-82

Most Valuable player

Scoring leaders

International

OUA players in the Olympics

Winter Universiade

2011
Jacalyn Sollis, Forward, Guelph : 2011 Winter Universiade
Jessica Zerafa, Forward, Guelph  2011 Winter Universiade

2015
Laura Brooker - Wilfrid Laurier : 2015 Winter Universiade
Katelyn Gosling, Defense, Western : Ice hockey at the 2015 Winter Universiade 
Nicole Kesteris – Toronto : 2015 Winter Universiade

2017
Katherine Bailey, Defense: Guelph : 2017 Winter Universiade
Katelyn Gosling, Defense: Western : 2017 Winter Universiade
Kelly Gribbons, Forward: Guelph : 2017 Winter Universiade
Brianna Iazzolino, Defense: Western : 2017 Winter Universiade
Valerie Lamenta, Goaltender: Guelph : 2017 Winter Universiade
Rachel Marriott, Forward: Waterloo : 2017 Winter Universiade
Stephanie Sluys, Goaltender: Waterloo : Ice hockey at the 2017 Winter Universiade
Coaching staff
Rachel Flanagan, Head Coach: Guelph 
Kelly Paton, Assistant Coach: Western 
Shaun Reagan, Assistant Coach: Waterloo

2019
Ailish Forfar, Forward: Ryerson 
Lauren Straatman - Toronto : Ice hockey at the 2019 Winter Universiade

References

External links
 

U Sports women's ice hockey
Ice hockey in Ontario
Women in Ontario